Albert Duvaleix (1893-1962) was a French stage and film actor.  A character actor he appeared in a number of supporting roles in French comedies and drama films. His son Christian Duvaleix also became an actor.

Selected filmography

 Beauty Spot (1932)
 Juanita (1935)
 Marinella (1936)
 The King (1936)
 The Volga Boatman (1936)
 Les Femmes collantes (1938)
 The Porter from Maxim's (1939)
 The Five Cents of Lavarede (1939)
 Metropolitan (1939)
 At Your Command, Madame (1942)
 Night Shift (1944)
 First on the Rope (1944)
 Song of the Clouds (1946)
 Not So Stupid (1946)
 The Unknown Singer (1947)
 The Woman in Red (1947)
 To the Eyes of Memory (1948)
 Thus Finishes the Night (1949)
 Branquignol (1949)
 The Prize (1950)
 We Will All Go to Paris (1950)
 La Poison (1951)
 Deburau (1951)
 No Vacation for Mr. Mayor (1951)
 Crazy for Love (1952)
 Monsieur Leguignon, Signalman (1952)
 Koenigsmark (1953)
 The Drunkard (1953)
 The Fighting Drummer (1953)
 Obsession (1954)
 The Whole Town Accuses (1956)

References

Bibliography
Bessy, Maurice & Chirat, Raymond. Histoire du cinéma français: 1929-1934. Pygmalion, 1988.
 Leteux, Christine. Continental Films: French Cinema Under German Control. University of Wisconsin Pres,  2022.

External links

1893 births
1962 deaths
French male film actors
French male stage actors
People from Bordeaux

fr:Albert Duvaleix